Michael Sell (born August 23, 1972) is a former professional tennis player from the United States. He was the co-head coach of the women’s tennis team at Louisiana State University with Julia Sell from 2015 to April 2022.

Career
Before he turned professional, Sell played for the University of Georgia and was an All-American every year from 1992 to 1995. He won a bronze medal in the men's doubles at the 1993 Summer Universiade, partnering Rob Givone.

Sell appeared in the main singles draw of two Grand Slams. In the 1997 US Open he beat Cecil Mamiit in the opening round, then lost in four sets to Daniel Vacek the next time he played. He exited in the opening round of the 1998 French Open, losing to Jordi Mas, despite taking the first set 6–0. His best performance on the singles circuit came at the 1999 Japan Open Tennis Championships, where he defeated Mark Woodforde and Gouichi Motomura to make the round of 16. In the 2000 Heineken Open he had a win over world number 34 Nicolas Escude.

As a doubles player he was more successful, reaching the second round of all four Grand Slams, including the 1998 Australian Open where he partnered French Open winner Gustavo Kuerten. His best results came when he teamed up with countryman David DiLucia. The pair twice made the semi-finals of San Jose's Sybase Open, in 1998 and 1999.

He is now a tennis coach and has served as the personal coach of Monica Seles, Donald Young and John Isner.

Challenger Titles

Singles: (3)

Doubles: (11)

Coaching career
 2001-2003 - Monica Seles - Personal Coach
 2003-2007 - USTA National Coach
 2007-2012 - USTA Lead National Coach
 2012 - USA Olympic Assistant Tennis Coach - London Games
 2013-2014 - John Isner - Personal Coach
 2015-2022 - Co-head Coach LSU Women's Tennis
 2022 to Current - Director LTP Professional Program

References

External links
LSU Tigers bio

1972 births
Living people
American male tennis players
American tennis coaches
Georgia Bulldogs tennis players
LSU Lady Tigers tennis coaches
Tennis people from California
Sportspeople from Berkeley, California
Universiade medalists in tennis
Universiade bronze medalists for the United States